St. Xavier's College, Ranchi is an Autonomous College affiliated to Ranchi University. It is located in the Indian state of Jharkhand. It was founded in 1944 by the Patna province of the Society of Jesus, a Catholic religious order that traces its origin to St. Ignatius of Loyola in 1540.

History
St. Xavier's College, Ranchi is a Minority Educational Institution. Initially it had affiliations with Patna University. Post 1960 the affiliation was switched to Ranchi University. The University Grants Commission conferred autonomous status in 2005 and granted 'College with Potential for Excellence' status in 2006. Grade 'A' accreditation with a rating of 3.2 out of 4 was granted by NAAC in 2013. The Intermediate section of the college is affiliated to the Jharkhand Academic Council which comes under State board of Jharkhand.

Academics
The courses of study includes:
 Intermediate in Arts, Science, & Commerce
 Bachelor in Arts, Science, & Commerce
 Master in Arts, Commerce, & Computer Applications
 Bachelor in Education
 Vocational Programs in Science & Commerce
 Diploma Program
Xavier Ranchi has the following academic programs:
 
Intermediate
Science (I.Sc)
Arts (I.A.)
Commerce (I.COM.)

Bachelor of Arts (B.A.)
English
Hindi
Geography
Economics
History
Political Science
Sociology
 
Bachelor of Science (B.Sc.)
Physics
Chemistry
Botany
Zoology
Geology
Statistics
Mathematics
Mathematics & Statistics
 
Bachelor of Commerce (B.Com.)
Accounts

Self-Financed Course
Bachelor of Arts in English Language & Literature (ELL)
Bachelor of Arts in Journalism and Mass Communication
Bachelor of Science in Computer Application
Bachelor of Science in Information Technology
Bachelor of Science in Biotechnology
Bachelor of Commerce in Advertising & Marketing
Bachelor of Commerce in Office Management and Secretarial Practice
Bachelor of Commerce in Banking & Insurance 
Bachelor of Commerce in International Accounting & Finance
Bachelor of Business Management
Bachelor of Finance Market Operation
Bachelor of Retail Management
Bachelor of Construction Management
Bachelor of Fashion Technology
Diploma in Arts in Animation and Interior Design

Master's degree Programs
English
Hindi
Geography
Political Science
History
Accounts
Journalism & Mass Comm.
Computer Application(M.C.A)
Chemistry
Zoology
Geology
Botany

Facilities
St. Xavier's College, Ranchi has a study room and library which was established in 1944. It was called 'Meletre Baraque' and was situated in front of the Principal's office. In 1960, it was shifted to the Arts Block. Thereafter in 1996 the stack room was enlarged. It currently contains about 100,000 books and journals.

Sports facilities are available in the college for volleyball, basketball, hockey, cricket, football, badminton and various indoor games.

The college campus has a fitness Gymkhana, several common rooms, four canteens and cafeterias. The college also provides hostel for boys belonging to both majority and minority or lower socio-economic culture. A church is also present in the college campus.

Sister institution 
St. Xavier's College, Simdega is a sister institution established by Jesuits of Ranchi province.

See also
 Education in India
 Literacy in India
 List of institutions of higher education in Jharkhand
 List of Jesuit sites

References

External links 
 

Colleges affiliated to Ranchi University
Jesuit universities and colleges in India
Universities and colleges in Ranchi
Educational institutions established in 1944
1944 establishments in India
Universities and colleges in Jharkhand